Natali Vineyards is a winery in the Goshen section of Middle Township (mailing address is Cape May Court House) in Cape May County, New Jersey, USA. Formerly a pasture for horses, the vineyard was first planted in 2001, and opened to the public in 2007. Natali has seven acres of grapes under cultivation, and produces 1,800 cases of wine per year. The winery is named after the vintner and co-owner of the winery.

Wines
Natali Vineyards is located in the Outer Coastal Plain AVA and produces wine from 
Cabernet Franc, Cabernet Sauvignon, Chardonnay, Dolcetto, Merlot, Muscat blanc, Nebbiolo, Pinot gris, Sauvignon blanc, Syrah, Tempranillo, Trebbiano, Viognier and Zinfandel grapes. Natali also makes fruit wines from bananas, beach plums, blackberries, blueberries, cherries, cranberries, peaches, pineapples, plums and strawberries. It is the only winery in the world that produces wine from beach plums (Prunus maritima), a fruit that grows in coastal areas, and is often used to make jams. Natali is also the only New Jersey winery that uses bananas.

Licensing and associations
Natali has a plenary winery license from the New Jersey Division of Alcoholic Beverage Control, which allows it to produce an unrestricted amount of wine, operate up to 15 off-premises sales rooms, and ship up to 12 cases per year to consumers in-state or out-of-state. The winery is a member of the Garden State Wine Growers Association and the Outer Coastal Plain Vineyard Association.

See also 
Alcohol laws of New Jersey
American wine
Judgment of Princeton
List of wineries, breweries, and distilleries in New Jersey
New Jersey Farm Winery Act
New Jersey Wine Industry Advisory Council
New Jersey wine

References

External links 
Garden State Wine Growers Association
Outer Coastal Plain Vineyard Association

Middle Township, New Jersey
Wineries in New Jersey
Tourist attractions in Cape May County, New Jersey
2007 establishments in New Jersey